The teams competing in Group 9 of the 2009 UEFA European Under-21 Championship qualifying competition are Germany, Israel, Luxembourg, Moldova and Northern Ireland.

Standings

Key: Pts Points, Pld Matches played, W Won, D Drawn, L Lost, GF Goals for, GA Goals against, GD Goal Difference

Matches

Goalscorers

1 goal
: Dennis Aogo, Ashkan Dejagah, Patrick Ebert, Daniel Halfar, Toni Kroos, Marc-André Kruska
: Yuval Avidor, Dovev Gabay, Tamir Kahlon, Idan Srur, Lior Jan
: Chris Sagramola
: Maxim Frantuz, Iurie Livandovschi, Artur Pătraş
: Daryl Fordyce, Thomas Stewart
Own goals
: Dennis Aogo

Group 9
Under
Under
UEFA
UEFA
Under
Under